Sayer is a surname, and may refer to:

 Andrew Sayer (born 1949), British social scientist and philosopher of science
 George Sayer (1914–2005), English teacher and biographer
 George Sayer (MP) (1655–1718), English politician, MP for Canterbury
 Gerry Sayer (1905–1942), British pilot and air force officer
 Guillaume Sayer (c.1801–c.1849), Métis fur trader
 Ian Sayer (born 1945), English writer and businessman
 Jess Sayer, New Zealand actress and playwright
 John William Sayer (1879–1918), English non-commissioned officer in World War I and Victoria Cross recipient
 Leo Sayer (born 1948), British singer-songwriter
 Malcolm Sayer (1916–1970), British aircraft and car designer
 Paul Sayer (born 1955), English novelist
 Peter Sayer (born 1955), Welsh professional footballer
 Phil Sayer (1953–2016), British voice artist
 Richard Sayer, English politician, MP for Grampound, 1588–1589
 Roger Sayer, British organist
 Sylvia Sayer (1904–2000), English conservator
 William Sayer (1857–1943), Australian lawyer and politician

See also
 Sayers (surname)
 Sawyer